This is a list of compositions by Miklós Rózsa.

Orchestral

 Theme, Variations and Finale, Op. 13 (1933, revised in 1966 as Op. 13a)
 Three Hungarian Sketches, Op. 14 (1938, revised in 1958 as Op. 14a)
 Concerto for String Orchestra, Op. 17 (1943)
 Hungarian Serenade, Op. 25 (1945)
 Kaleidoscope - six short pieces for small orchestra, Op. 19a (1957)
 The Vintner's Daughter - twelve variations on a French folk song, Op. 23a (1953)
 Overture to a Symphony Concert, Op. 26 (recorded 1955, revised in 1963 as Op. 26a)
 Notturno Ungherese, Op. 28 (1964)
 Tripartita for Orchestra, Op. 33 (1972)
 Festive Flourish (1975)
 Symphony in Three Movements, Op. 6a (1933-1993; unpublished)

Concertante

 Rhapsody for cello and orchestra, Op. 3 (1929)
 Variations on a Hungarian Folk Song for violin and orchestra, Op. 4 (1929)
 North Hungarian Peasant Songs and Dances for violin and orchestra, Op. 5 (1929)
 Violin Concerto, Op. 24 (1953)
 Sinfonia Concertante for violin, cello and orchestra, Op. 29 (1966)
 Tema con variazioni for violin, cello and orchestra, Op. 29a (1962)
 Piano Concerto, Op. 31 (1967)
 Cello Concerto, Op. 32 (1968)
 Viola Concerto, Op. 37 (1982)
 Concerto for 2 pianos and orchestra "New England" (1984)

Chamber music

 String Trio, Op. 1 (1927)
 Quintet for piano and string quartet, Op. 2 (1928)
 Duo for violin and piano, Op. 7 (1931)
 Duo for cello and piano, Op. 8 (1931)
 Sonata for two violins, Op. 15 (1933, revised in 1973 as Op. 15a)
 String Quartet No. 1, Op. 22 (1950)
 String Quartet No. 2, Op. 38 (1981)

Chamber versions of concertante works

 Rhapsody for cello and piano, Op. 3
 Variations on a Hungarian Folk Song for violin and piano, Op. 4
 North Hungarian Peasant Songs and Dances for violin and piano, Op. 5
 Violin Concerto for violin and piano, Op. 24
 Piano Concerto for two pianos, Op. 31
 Cello Concerto for cello and piano, Op. 32
 Viola Concerto for viola and piano, Op. 37

Chamber versions of film scores

 El Cid Selection for string quartet
 Spellbound Concerto for theremin, piano, oboe and string quartet

Works for solo instruments

 Sonatina for clarinet solo, Op. 27 (1951)
 Toccata Capricciosa for cello, Op. 36 (1977)
 Sonata for flute solo, Op. 39 (1983)
 Sonata for violin solo, Op. 40 (1986)
 Sonata for clarinet solo, Op. 41 (1986)
 Sonata for guitar, Op. 42 (1986)
 Sonata for oboe solo, Op. 43 (1987)
 Introduction and Allegro for viola solo, Op. 44 (1988)
 Sonatina for Ondes Martenot, Op. 45 (1989)

Piano music

 Variations pour piano, Op. 9 (1932)
 Bagatelles (Little Pieces for Play & Dance), Op. 12 (1933)
 Kaleidoscope, Op. 19 (1946)
 Piano Sonata, Op. 20 (1948)
 The Vintner's Daughter - twelve variations on a French folk song, Op. 23 (1952)

Vocal music

 Five Songs for voice and piano
 Invocation, Op. 16a (1940) for contralto
 Beasts of Burden, Op. 16b (1940) for contralto
 My Little Town (1972) for soprano or tenor
 The Land Where My Heart Lies (1972) for soprano or tenor
 High Flight (1942-1974) for tenor
 Two choruses for female voices a cappella, Op. 18 (1946)
 Lullaby
 Madrigal of Spring
 To Everything There Is a Season - motet for 8-part mixed chorus with optional organ or piano, Op. 21 (1946)
 The Vanities of Life - motet for 8-part mixed chorus with optional organ or piano, Op. 30 (1967)
 The Lord Is My Shepherd for 4-part mixed chorus a cappella based on the Psalm 23, Op. 34 (1972)
 Three Chinese Poems for mixed chorus a cappella, Op. 35 (1975)
 Sailing Homeward
 Swallow, Swallow
 The Cuckoo

Concert versions of film scores

All versions are suites; exceptions are noted.

 The Thief of Baghdad (1940)
 Love Theme from Lady Hamilton (1941)
 Love Theme and Waltz from Lady Hamilton (1941)
 The Jungle Book for narrator and orchestra (1942)
 Lullaby from The Jungle Book for mixed chorus a cappella (1942)
 Sahara (1943)
 Double Indemnity (1944)
 The Lost Weekend (1945)
 Spellbound Concerto (1946) in multiple versions
 Full orchestral version (1946)
 Piano and orchestra (1946)
Theremin, piano, oboe and string quartet (1946, arranged by Alphonso D'Artega for Lucie Bigelow Rosen)
 Concerto Fantasy for two pianos and orchestra (1984)
 The Strange Love of Martha Ivers (1946)
 The Killers (1946)
 The Red House (1947)
 Mark Hellinger (1948)
 The Madame Bovary Waltz (1949)
 Quo Vadis (both orchestral and choral suites) (1951)
 Hail Nero and Triumphal March from Quo Vadis for concert band or brass band (1951)
 Ivanhoe (1952)
 Lust for Life (1956)
 Ben-Hur (1959)
 Orchestral suite
 Choral suite
 For wind orchestra
 Choral suite from King of Kings (1961)
 Resurrection and Finale from King of Kings (1961)
 El Cid Suite (1963)
 Overture and March
 Selection for string quartet
 Finale from Providence (1977)
 The Tunnel from The Last Embrace (1979)
 Dead Men Don't Wear Plaid (1982)
 New England Concerto for two pianos and orchestra featuring themes from Lydia and Time Out of Mind (1984)
 Fantasy on themes from Young Bess for organ, harp, brass and timpani (1984)
 Suite in the Olden Style

Film scores

 Knight Without Armour (1937)
 The Squeaker (Murder on Diamond Row) (1937)
 Thunder in the City (1937)
 The Green Cockatoo (1937)
 The Divorce of Lady X (1938); music also by Lionel Salter
 The Four Feathers (1939)
 On the Night of the Fire (The Fugitive) (1939)
 The Spy in Black (1939)
 Ten Days in Paris (1940)
 The Thief of Bagdad (1940)
 New Wine (The Great Awakening) (1941)
 Lydia (1941)
 Sundown (1941)
 That Hamilton Woman  (1941)
 Jacaré (As musical director) (1942)
 Jungle Book (1942)
 To Be or Not to Be (1942); music also by Werner R. Heymann
 Five Graves to Cairo (1943)
 Sahara (1943)
 So Proudly We Hail! (1943); music also by Edward Heyman
 The Woman of the Town (1943)
 Dark Waters (1944)
 Double Indemnity (1944)
 The Hour Before the Dawn (1944)
 Blood on the Sun (1945)
 Lady on a Train (1945)
 The Lost Weekend (1945)
 The Man in Half Moon Street (1945)
 A Song to Remember (1945)
 Spellbound (1945)
 Because of Him (1946)
 The Killers (1946)
 The Strange Love of Martha Ivers (1946)
 Brute Force (1947)
 Desert Fury (1947)
 A Double Life (1947)
 The Macomber Affair (1947)
 The Other Love (1947)
 The Red House (1947)
 Song of Scheherazade (1947)
 Time Out of Mind (1947)
 Kiss the Blood Off My Hands (1948)
 The Naked City (1948); music also by Frank Skinner
 Secret Beyond the Door (1948)
 A Woman's Vengeance (1948)
 Adam's Rib (1949); music also by Cole Porter
 The Bribe (1949)
 Command Decision (1949)
 Criss Cross (1949)
 East Side, West Side (1949)
 Madame Bovary (1949)
 The Red Danube (1949)
 The Asphalt Jungle (1950)
 Crisis (1950)
 The Miniver Story (1950); music also by Herbert Stothart
 Quo Vadis (1951)
 Ivanhoe (1952)
 The Light Touch (1952)
 Plymouth Adventure (1952)
 All the Brothers Were Valiant (1953)
 Julius Caesar (1953)
 Knights of the Round Table (1953)
 The Story of Three Loves (1953)
 Young Bess (1953)
 Beau Brummell (1954); Main and end titles, score composed by Richard Addinsell
 Green Fire (1954)
 Men of the Fighting Lady (1954)
 Seagulls Over Sorrento (1954)
 Valley of the Kings (1954)
 The King's Thief (1955)
 Moonfleet (1955); music also by Vicente Gómez
 Bhowani Junction (1956)
 Diane (1956)
 Lust for Life (1956)
 Tribute to a Bad Man (1956)
 Something of Value (1957)
 Tip on a Dead Jockey (1957)
 The Seventh Sin (1957)
 A Time to Love and a Time to Die (1958)
 Ben-Hur (1959)
 The World, the Flesh and the Devil (1959)
 King of Kings (1961)
 El Cid (1961)
 Sodom and Gomorrah (1963)
 The V.I.P.s (1963)
 The Power (1968)
 The Green Berets (1968)
 The Private Life of Sherlock Holmes (1970)
 The Golden Voyage of Sinbad (1974)
 The Private Files of J. Edgar Hoover (1977)
 Providence (1977)
 Fedora (1978)
 Last Embrace (1979)
 Time After Time (1979)
 Eye of the Needle (1981)
 Dead Men Don't Wear Plaid'' (1982)

Rozsa, Miklos